Interleukin-22 receptor is a type II cytokine receptor. It binds to Interleukin-22. It is a heterodimer of α1 and IL-10Rβ2 subunits.

References

External links
 

Type II cytokine receptors